Eray Ataseven (born 29 June 1993) is a Turkish footballer who plays as a midfielder for Boluspor.

Professional career
He made his Süper Lig debut on 31 March 2012 against Gençlerbirliği.

On 10 May 2018, Hasan Ali helped Akhisar Belediyespor win their first professional trophy, the 2017–18 Turkish Cup.

Honours
Akhisarspor
 Turkish Cup (1): 2017-18
 Turkish Super Cup: 2018

References

External links
 
 
 
 Eray Ataseven at eurosport.com
 Eray Ataseven at goal.com
 

1993 births
Sportspeople from İzmit
Living people
Turkish footballers
Turkey youth international footballers
Turkey under-21 international footballers
Association football midfielders
Manisaspor footballers
Balıkesirspor footballers
Akhisarspor footballers
1461 Trabzon footballers
Boluspor footballers
Süper Lig players
TFF First League players
TFF Second League players